Bertrand R. Brinley (19 June 1917 in Hudson, New York – 20 October 1994 in Luray, Virginia) was an American writer of short stories and children's tales. He was best known for his Mad Scientists' Club  stories.

The stories in The Mad Scientists' Club originally appeared over several years in Boys' Life magazine, starting in 1961, and were later collected into book form. The Mad Scientists' Club, The New Adventures of The Mad Scientists' Club and The Big Kerplop! were first published by the now-defunct MacRae Smith Company of Philadelphia, Pennsylvania.  Much of the character of Mammoth Falls, the fictional town where the Mad Scientists' adventures take place, was based on the town of West Newbury, Massachusetts, where Brinley lived during part of his youth and where he graduated from high school in 1935.   West Newbury contributed a good many place names and several of the characters to the Mad Scientists' Club stories.

They have since been republished by Purple House Press in Cynthiana, Kentucky.  Brinley's final work, The Big Chunk of Ice, was published posthumously in 2005 by Purple House Press with permission from his son, Sheridan Brinley.

Writings 
Rocket Manual for Amateurs (1960, nonfiction)
The Mad Scientists' Club (1965, juvenile)
The New Adventures of the Mad Scientists' Club (1968, juvenile)
The Big Kerplop! (1974, juvenile)
The Big Chunk of Ice (2005, juvenile)

See also 

 Charles Geer (illustrator)

References

External links
 Mad Scientists' Club: The Official Website
 Purple House Press Mad Scientists' Club page

1917 births
1994 deaths
American children's writers
American science writers
People from Hudson, New York
People from West Newbury, Massachusetts
Writers from New York (state)
20th-century American short story writers
20th-century American non-fiction writers